H.E.D.Z. or Head Extreme Destruction Zone is a 1998 action game for Windows from VIS Interactive published by Hasbro Interactive. The player, whose character is an alien, selects heads (five starters, hundreds throughout the game) and goes on a preset order of battlefields to fight other aliens for heads, as well as the right to be the MVP of the arenas.

Premise
The premise of the game for the player is to acquire as many various number of 'heads' from competing aliens as they can; any head they acquire that is already in their inventory is redeemed for Z money, which the player can use to replenish health to current heads or ones in their backpack.

Every level is engineered uniquely based on its 'style' and there are a number of special condition areas that one must meet requirements to reach, like hitting a button and reaching the destination before it resets, or eliminating all hostiles in the area.

Head Types
Each head can have a primary type and special attribute.
Gun - Machinegun like rapid-fire or single shot with no delay in between attacks.
Medic - Takes the damage from the other headcase heads onto itself until its reached near 0 hit points, this effect grows more efficient with later medic type heads(taking more damage quickly while sustaining slower damage to self)
Arrow - Nothing more than an arrow fired slowly from a crossbow based weapon, strengths dependent on the head.
Swarm - Creates a cloud of insects around the attacker by holding the attack key, then releasing it to unleash it on an enemy.
Curver - A throwing-based weapon that flies straight towards its target, regardless if he is moving, as it will curve towards him.
Bouncer - A throwing attack object that bounces and semi-homes in on the target, will explode without damage if contact fails.
Laser - Fires a laser beam that bounces off of surfaces.
Thruster - Vehicular based super-propulsion gives one more damage when running down other head players.
Thrown - Tossed object for damage, some can be explosive on contact.
Missile - One of the most powerful types regardless of character, fast projectile flies towards near-line of sight targets for large damage, also master missile type heads fire 2 at a time.(but only have a 5 missile limit before needing reload)
Guided Missile - Not as effective as the Missile, but allows for a first person view of the missile as the player guides it to its target
Invisibility - Grants invisibility to the user until power runs out
Sprouter - A donut like swirling ring is fired, once hits target it elevates them above the ground and holds them in place in a geyser until it wears off
AA Gun - A first person machinegun attack steered by movement keys
Bomb Drop - First person viewed attack from above straight down to the ground
High Jump - Super powerful leap into the air
Earthquake - Rocks the ground nearby you regardless of elevation differences for many instances of small amounts of damage, some have bursts of damage while others can sustain it longer.
Shield - Offers personal protection from attack
Power Shield - A red variant of the shield that will damage enemies upon contact.
Spray - An attack using a powderlike shot effect.
Turbo - Allows one to run real fast, no attack power whatsoever.
Pet Attack - A seeker-like ground attack in the form of a creature of some sort.
Mine - A deceptive attack using "head" coin lookalikes which are really explosive traps
Cell - If it makes contact, target is completely immobile until the cell expires, effectively a prison that leaves one vulnerable
Teleportation - Not so much as teleportation as much as steady levitation
Flamer - Able to control a spray-paint like fire stream that spreads as it moves forward.
Dropped - An attack strictly associated with flight heads, where used when right near an enemy from above, usually explosive.

Special Ability classes for heads
Glider - A limited version of the Aircraft flight capabilities limited to up, down, left, and right.
Hover - Allows one to cruise above the surface, granting resistance to ground-based attacks like earthquake.
Boat - Allows easy movement on water, very ineffective on anything else.
Motorbike - Just what it says, cannot drift as well as an automobile type, but handles better.
Automobile - Lets the head move very fast along the ground, will do damage when the player runs down an enemy, as any vehicle would.
Airplane - Gives the power of full flight, certain movement keys will grant special flight maneuvers such as Immelmann turn and barrel rolls.

World Types

The Nappa Flux consists of fours sets of asteroids. Each set of asteroids is called a Dan and each Dan contains five different levels.

Each asteroid has its own 'world' modeled after themes from earth, where everything else was abducted, and with each world comes with different itinerary for 'world moving' mechanics
Laboratory - Buttons can operate whole sections of gravity lines which will lift the player skyward upon stepping under it, the patterns further accentuate a 'scientific' style with electrical circuit lines, and computer light panels as well.
City - Buildings, sewers, and boarded up zones (sometimes, those that aren't are usually secret accesses) make up this cityscape asteroid, not much different from what one would see, except deserted streets (other than their opponents).
Haunted Castle - Cathedrals, scary houses, graveyards, and mausoleum castlescapes comprise  this dark sky world that is most likely rife with a number of traps, such as lava fields and drop zones, take extreme caution as areas open up only after some criteria are met.
WarZone - One could say a war was being fought here, as the jungle world is literally scattered about with war shacks, watch towers(complete with ranged attackers) and secret access points, very natural and very dangerous.
Toyland - Children's toys, building blocks, letter blocks, nothing about this level can be taken seriously, as is the point for this soft-hearted world.  The only exception is the opposition you will meet along the way, as each time you're here you tend to encounter some rather strong head characters.
Refinery/Plant - Mechanical sets of movers and conveyors make up this industrial utopia, elevator systems are also present in this world set, clearing each section will allow access to the next floor.
Master Zone - This is where the player gets tested, against heads they previously fought in the last four asteroids.  A time limit is in effect and, should the player run out of time, they will lose and be recalled out of the playing area to start over.  Defeat all heads in a subsector by defeating the Keybearer alien, the key he drops will add to their time limit and unlock the next sector.  At the Master Zone's goal line rests a special head that they will never see again unless they take it from the Exit Warp pad.

Development
The game was announced in June 1997.

Reception

The game received "mixed" reviews according to the review aggregation website GameRankings.

References

External links

1998 video games
3D platform games
Action video games
Hasbro products
Single-player video games
Video games about extraterrestrial life
Video games developed in the United Kingdom
VIS Entertainment games
Windows games
Windows-only games